Lewis Tessier (1820 – April 30, 1884) was an English-born merchant and political figure in Newfoundland. He represented St. John's West in the Newfoundland and Labrador House of Assembly from 1870 to 1882 as a Liberal.

He was born in Newton Abbot, Devon and came to Newfoundland with his brother Peter Germon in 1835. The brothers established the mercantile company P. & L. Tessier in 1847. By the 1870s, the firm had become one of the largest fishing supply and fish export businesses in Newfoundland. Tessier was opposed to union with Canada. He died in St. John's in 1884.

His former residence in St. John's is now the home of the Heritage Foundation of Newfoundland and Labrador.

References 
 

Members of the Newfoundland and Labrador House of Assembly
1820 births
1884 deaths
English emigrants to pre-Confederation Newfoundland
Newfoundland Colony people